In a Romantic Mood is a 1955 album by Oscar Peterson, accompanied by an orchestra arranged by Russ Garcia.

Track listing
 "Ruby" (Mitchell Parish, Heinz Eric Roemheld) – 3:14
 "Stars Fell on Alabama" (Parish, Frank Perkins) – 3:40
 "Black Coffee" (Sonny Burke, Paul Francis Webster) – 2:17 
 "Laura" (Johnny Mercer, David Raksin) – 6:26
 "The Boy Next Door" (Hugh Martin, Ralph Blane) – 2:19
 "Our Waltz" (David Rose) – 2:54
 "Tenderly" (Walter Gross, Jack Lawrence) – 3:53
 "I Thought About You" (Jimmy Van Heusen, Mercer) – 2:19
 "I Only Have Eyes for You" (Al Dubin, Harry Warren) – 2:46 
 "Stella by Starlight" (Ned Washington, Victor Young) – 3:27
 "A Sunday Kind of Love" (Barbara Bell, Anita Leonard, Louis Prima, Stan Rhodes) – 3:32
 "It Could Happen to You" (Johnny Burke, Van Heusen) – 3:45

Personnel

Performance
 Oscar Peterson – piano
 Russ Garcia – arranger, conductor

References

1955 albums
Oscar Peterson albums
Albums produced by Norman Granz
Albums arranged by Russell Garcia (composer)
Albums conducted by Russell Garcia (composer)
Verve Records albums